Cayenne is a Canadian short drama film, directed by Simon Gionet and released in February 2020.

Plot 
During her shift at a remote gas station, a female clerk ventures in the night to fix a man's broken car, unsure if she should have trusted him.

Accolades

References

External links 

 
 

2020 films
2020 short films
Quebec films
Films shot in Quebec
Canadian drama short films
2020s Canadian films